The eighth generation (Generation VIII) of the Pokémon franchise features 96 fictional species of creatures introduced to the core video game series, including 89 in the 2019 Nintendo Switch games Pokémon Sword and Shield as of version 1.3.0 and 7 further species introduced in the 2022 Nintendo Switch game Pokémon Legends: Arceus. The Pokémon Sword and Shield starter Pokémon were the first Pokémon of the generation to be revealed on February 27, 2019.

A notable change in the eighth generation compared to previous ones is that, new Pokémon and forms were introduced via game patches rather than new games.

Design and development
The development of Pokémon Sword and Shield began in 2016, immediately following the development period of Pokémon Sun and Moon. The conceptual phase lasted approximately a year, and the debugging process continued into 2019. With the Galar region based in Great Britain, some of the native Pokémon draw inspiration from British fauna, folklore, and mythology. The legendary Pokémon Zacian and Zamazenta resemble real-world wolves, drawing inspiration from wolves that frequently appear in British mythology. Shigeru Ohmori, the director for Sword and Shield, stated that the design team keeps a Pokémon's habitat in mind when coming up with its design so as to make the Pokémon believable.

Pokémon Legends: Arceus introduces the Hisui Region, based on the real-world Japanese island of Hokkaido. The Hisui Region is a reimagining of the Generation IV games' Sinnoh Region set in the past prior to the events of those games.

Like the previous generation, redesigned versions of previously released Pokémon ("Galarian Forms" and "Hisuian Forms") were included alongside brand new creatures.

For the first time, many new Pokémon and regional forms were added to the generation through game patches rather than through the release of a new game. Acquiring these Pokémon requires purchasing an add-on downloadable content pass separate from the base game or utilizing the in-game trade feature. Further patches added other new species, including legendary and mythical Pokémon Kubfu, Urshifu, and Zarude in June 2020 and Regieleki, Regidrago, Glastrier, Spectrier, and Calyrex in October 2020.

List of Pokémon

 Grookey
 Thwackey
 Rillaboom
 Scorbunny
 Raboot
 Cinderace
 Sobble
 Drizzile
 Inteleon
 Skwovet
 Greedent
 Rookidee
 Corvisquire
 Corviknight
 Blipbug
 Dottler
 Orbeetle
 Nickit
 Thievul
 Gossifleur
 Eldegoss
 Wooloo
 Dubwool
 Chewtle
 Drednaw
 Yamper
 Boltund
 Rolycoly
 Carkol
 Coalossal
 Applin
 Flapple
 Appletun
 Silicobra
 Sandaconda
 Cramorant
 Arrokuda
 Barraskewda
 Toxel
 Toxtricity
 Sizzlipede
 Centiskorch
 Clobbopus
 Grapploct
 Sinistea
 Polteageist
 Hatenna
 Hattrem
 Hatterene
 Impidimp
 Morgrem
 Grimmsnarl
 Obstagoon
 Perrserker
 Cursola
 Sirfetch'd
 Mr. Rime
 Runerigus
 Milcery
 Alcremie
 Falinks
 Pincurchin
 Snom
 Frosmoth
 Stonjourner
 Eiscue
 Indeedee
 Morpeko
 Cufant
 Copperajah
 Dracozolt
 Arctozolt
 Dracovish
 Arctovish
 Duraludon
 Dreepy
 Drakloak
 Dragapult
 Zacian
 Zamazenta
 Eternatus
 Kubfu
 Urshifu
 Zarude
 Regieleki
 Regidrago
 Glastrier
 Spectrier
 Calyrex
 Wyrdeer
 Kleavor
 Ursaluna
 Basculegion
 Sneasler
 Overqwil
 Enamorus

Galarian Forms

 Meowth
 Ponyta
 Rapidash
 Slowpoke
 Slowbro
 Farfetch'd
 Weezing
 Mr. Mime
 Articuno
 Zapdos
 Moltres
 Slowking
 Corsola
 Zigzagoon
 Linoone
 Darumaka
 Darmanitan
 Yamask
 Stunfisk

Hisuian Forms 

 Growlithe
 Arcanine
 Voltorb
 Electrode
 Typhlosion
 Qwilfish
 Sneasel
 Samurott
 Lilligant
 Zorua
 Zoroark
 Braviary
 Sligoo
 Goodra
 Avalugg
 Decidueye

Gigantamax Forms

 Venusaur
 Charizard
 Blastoise
 Butterfree
 Pikachu
 Meowth
 Machamp
 Gengar
 Kingler
 Lapras
 Eevee
 Snorlax
 Garbodor
 Melmetal
 Rillaboom
 Cinderace
 Inteleon
 Corviknight
 Orbeetle
 Drednaw
 Coalossal
 Flapple
 Appletun
 Sandaconda
 Toxtricity
 Centiskorch
 Hatterene
 Grimmsnarl
 Alcremie
 Copperajah
 Duraludon
 Urshifu

References 

Lists of Pokémon
Video game characters introduced in 2019
Video game characters introduced in 2020
Video game characters introduced in 2022